Lymers FC is a Anguillan football club based in the capital The Valley that currently competes in the Anguilla Football League. The club was founded in 2018  and, like several other Anguillan clubs, plays its home matches at the 1,100-seat Raymond E. Guishard Technical Centre. The club also fields a team in the Anguilla U-17 Youth League founded in 2022.

Domestic history
Key

Notable players
This list of former players includes those who received international caps, made significant contributions to the team in terms of appearances or goals, or who made significant contributions to the sport. It is not complete or all inclusive, and additions and refinements will continue to be made over time.

 Danniell Bailey
 Damian Bailey
 Yannick Bellechasse
 Ikenya Browne
 Caleb Bryan
 Glenford Hughes
 Kelvin Liddie
 Jaleel Scarbrough

References

External links
Global Sports Archive profile

AFA Senior Male League clubs
Football clubs in Anguilla
Association football clubs established in 2018
The Valley, Anguilla